Hoscheid-Dickt is a village in the commune of Hoscheid, in northern Luxembourg.  , the village has a population of 278.  Nearby is the source of the Blees.

See also
 List of villages in Luxembourg

Villages in Luxembourg
Diekirch (canton)